Jannick Jørgensen Liburd (born September 26, 2001) is an American professional soccer player.

Club career
He made his Danish Superliga debut for SønderjyskE on July 8, 2020, in a game against Lyngby. He signed his first professional contract with the club on December 22, 2020. On 31 January 2023 Sønderjyske confirmed, that Liburd's contract had been terminated by mutual consent.

Personal life
Liburd was born in the United States and is of Kittitian and Danish descent. He moved to Denmark at a young age. As a result, he also holds Danish citizenship.

References

External links
 

2001 births
Soccer players from Houston
Living people
American soccer players
Danish men's footballers
American people of Danish descent
American people of Saint Kitts and Nevis descent
Danish people of Saint Kitts and Nevis descent
Association football forwards
SønderjyskE players
Danish Superliga players
Soccer players from Texas